Budhal Khan Shar is a village which is 0.8 km from Hindyari, Pakistan.

Populated places in Khairpur District
Thari Mirwah